The 1996 Formula One Indoor Trophy took place on December 7–8 at the Bologna Motor Show. The winner was Giancarlo Fisichella in a Benetton-Renault. The 1996 running of the event was the last non-championship Formula One event of any kind, as the event switched to Formula 3000 cars for the next year's running.

Participants

Results

Preliminary rounds

† By finishing fourth, Nakano should have progressed to the knockout stage. However, by crashing his car he could not compete and his place was inherited by Tarso Marques.

Knockout stage

References

 Bologna Sprint - The GEL Motorsport Information Page

Formula One Indoor Trophy
Formula One Indoor Trophy
Formula One Indoor Trophy